The 5th International Socialist Congress of the Second International era was held in Paris from September 23 to 27 in Paris. It was originally supposed to be held in Germany in 1899, but difficulties with the German authorities prevented this.

The Congress is notable for establishing the International Socialist Bureau, the permanent organization of the International, as well as with dealing with the questions of the socialist attitude toward reformism and colonialism.

On reformism, the Congress specifically addressed the question of socialists entering bourgeois governments. In 1899 the socialist Alexandre Millerand had taken a ministerial position in the French government of Pierre Waldeck-Rousseau, alongside the Marquis de Galliffet, who had led the suppression of the Paris Commune. Karl Kautsky proposed a compromise resolution to the effect that the entry of a socialist into a bourgeois government was not a normal but a transitional and exceptional emergency measure, and that Millerand's action was not a matter of principle but of tactics, acceptable if it had the mandate of his party. The resolution was adopted by a vote of 29–9 over Jules Guesde’s demand for unconditional condemnation of ministerialism.

Delegations

Resolutions 

The Congress passed resolutions on the following:
Creating a committee to establish permanent institutions of the International, what would become the International Socialist Bureau and secretariat
International labor legislation
International peace and militarism
The organization of the proletariat, expropriation of the bourgeoisie and socialization of the means of production.
Colonial policy
Universal suffrage
The general strike
Trusts
May Day

References 

Haupt, Georges La Deuxième Internationale, 1889-1914: étude critique des sources, essai bibliographique

External links 
Cinquiéme Congrés socialiste international tenu à Paris du 23 au 27 septembre 1900: Compte rendu analytique officiel

History of socialism
Second International
1900 in France
1900 conferences